The Collectio canonum Wigorniensis (also known as the Excerptiones Ecgberhti or as "Wulfstan's canon law collection") is a medieval canon law collection originating in southern England around the year 1005. It exists in multiple recensions, the earliest of which — "Recension A" — consists of just over 100 canons drawn from a variety of sources, most predominantly the ninth-century Frankish collection of penitential and canon law known as the Collectio canonum quadripartita. The author of Recension A is currently unknown. Other recensions also exist, slightly later in date than the first. These later recensions are extensions and augmentations of Recension A, and are known collectively as "Recension B". These later recensions all bear the unmistakable mark of having been created by Wulfstan, bishop of Worcester and archbishop of York, possibly sometime around the year 1008, though some of them may have been compiled as late as 1023, the year of Wulfstan's death. The collection treats a range of ecclesiastical and lay subjects, such as clerical discipline, church administration, lay and clerical penance, public and private penance, as well as a variety of spiritual, doctrinal and catechistic matters. Several "canons" in the collection verge on the character of sermons or expository texts rather than church canons in the traditional sense; but nearly every element in the collection is prescriptive in nature, and concerns the proper ordering of society in a Christian polity.

External links
 Cross and Hamer's edition, Wulfstan's canon law collection (Google Books, preview)
 Thorpe's edition in vol. 2 of his Ancient laws and institutes (Google Books)
 Johnson's English translation in his A collection of all the ecclesiastical laws (Google Books)
 Spelman's editio princeps in his Concilia, decreta, leges, constitutiones (Google Books)
 Discussion on the Anglo-Saxon canon law Web site
 A comprehensive edition of the canonical material in Cambridge, Corpus 265
 A comprehensive edition of the canonical material in the Oxford manuscript
 A comprehensive edition of the canonical material in the London manuscript
 A comprehensive edition of the canonical material in Cambridge, Corpus 190

Notes

Bibliography
P. Wormald, The making of English law: King Alfred to the twelfth century. Vol. I: legislation and its limits (Oxford, 1999; repr. 2000).
Wulfstan’s canon law collection, eds J.E. Cross and A. Hamer, Anglo-Saxon texts 1 (Cambridge, 1999).
A Wulfstan manuscript, containing institutes, laws and homilies (British Museum Cotton Nero A.I), ed. H.R. Loyn, Early English manuscripts in facsimile 17 (Copenhagen, 1971).
Canon law codifications
11th-century Latin books